Niall Blaney (born 29 January 1974) is an Irish politician who has been a Senator for the Agricultural Panel since April 2020. He was a member of Independent Fianna Fáil until he joined Fianna Fáil in 2006, he served as a Teachta Dála (TD) for Donegal North-East from 2002 to 2011. For personal reasons, he decided not to contest the 2011 general election. He had since contested a number of Seanad elections and attempted, but failed, to win a Fianna Fáil nomination in the Midlands–North-West constituency for the 2019 European Parliament election.

Early life
Niall Blaney hails from a family with a long political history. His grandfather Neal Blaney, his uncle Neil Blaney, and his father Harry Blaney all preceded him as TDs.

Niall Blaney was born in Letterkenny, County Donegal in 1974. He graduated from Letterkenny Institute of Technology with a diploma in civil engineering. He married Rosaleen in August 2002 and the couple had three children together. On 9 January 2011, at a political meeting at the Silver Tassie Hotel, Letterkenny, Blaney disclosed that he and his wife had agreed to an amicable separation and that he had moved out of the family home in Rosnakill, Fanad.

Local and national politics
Blaney first held public office when he was elected to Donegal County Council in 1999. Three years later, in the 2002 general election, he won election to Dáil Éireann, capturing the third seat in the Donegal North-East constituency after Fianna Fáil's Jim McDaid and Cecilia Keaveney.

Blaney started his political career as a member of Independent Fianna Fáil, a splinter group created by his uncle Neil T. Blaney when he was expelled from Fianna Fáil over the Arms Crisis of 1969–70. As a supporter of the Fianna Fáil–led coalition government upon his election to the Dáil, Blaney was widely anticipated to join Fianna Fáil and stand as a candidate for that party at the 2007 general election. Although some members of the Blaney family opposed the move, Niall Blaney announced on 26 July 2006 that he had joined the Fianna Fáil party, a move that marked the effective end of Independent Fianna Fáil.

At the 2007 general election, Blaney again won the third seat in the constituency, after Fine Gael's Joe McHugh and Fianna Fáil's Jim McDaid. He was elected on the eighth count after a closely fought struggle with Sinn Féin councillor Pádraig Mac Lochlainn.

Dáil retirement and Seanad campaigns
In a surprise statement on 30 January 2011, just hours before a Fianna Fáil selection convention for his constituency, Blaney announced that he would not be contesting the 2011 general election. He cited "personal reasons" for his decision. His retirement ended one of the longest family dynasties in Irish politics; a Blaney had served in the Oireachtas with only a few short breaks from 1927 to 2011.

Blaney was an unsuccessful candidate for the Industrial and Commercial Panel of Seanad Éireann in the April 2016 election.

He was also an unsuccessful candidate at the Seanad by-election in April 2018. The vacancy was caused by the resignation of Trevor Ó Clochartaigh of Sinn Féin from the Agricultural Panel. The seat was won by former Fine Gael TD Anthony Lawlor.

Blaney tried, but failed, to win a Fianna Fáil nomination in the Midlands–North-West constituency for the 2019 European Parliament election.

With the support of game shoot bodies regulator the National Association of Regional Game Councils (NARGC), Blaney was a candidate for the Agricultural Panel of Seanad Éireann in the March 2020 Seanad election. The move set him up against incumbent Senator Brian Ó Domhnaill (also with a history in Fianna Fáil). With only eleven seats available, Ó Domhnaill expressed surprise at Blaney's campaign, particularly as it was on a different panel than the one to which he sought admission in 2016. In March 2020, Blaney was elected to the Seanad, while Ó Domhnaill lost his seat.

Following his involvement in the Oireachtas Golf Society Scandal ("Golfgate") in August 2020, Blaney was one of six senators who lost the party whip in the Senate as punishment for their actions.

See also
Families in the Oireachtas

References

External links
Niall Blaney's page on the Fianna Fáil website

 

1974 births
Living people
Niall
Fianna Fáil TDs
Independent Fianna Fáil TDs
Local councillors in County Donegal
Members of the 29th Dáil
Members of the 30th Dáil
People from Letterkenny
Politicians from County Donegal
Members of the 26th Seanad
Fianna Fáil senators